This is a list of notable Belarusian sportspeople.

Archery
Yekaterina Mulyuk-Timofeyeva

Athletics

Igor Astapkovich
Maryna Arzamasava
Vadim Devyatovskiy
Vladimir Dubrovshchik
Vasiliy Kaptyukh
Janina Karolchyk
Andrei Krauchanka
Aksana Miankova
Andrei Mikhnevich
Natallia Mikhnevich
Yulia Nestsiarenka
Natallia Sazanovich
Alina Talay
Ellina Zvereva

Basketball

Ivan Edeshko
Tatyana Ivinskaya
Yelena Leuchanka
Natallia Marchanka
 Artsiom Parakhouski
 Roman Rubinshteyn 
Katsiaryna Snytsina
Roman Sorkin 
Anastasiya Verameyenka
 Maalik Wayns

Biathlon

Alexei Aidarov
Darya Domracheva
Vladimir Drachev
Liudmila Kalinchik
Viktor Maigourov
Olga Nazarova
Sergey Novikov
Svetlana Paramygina
Nadzeya Pisarava
Alexandr Popov
Eugeni Redkine
Oleg Ryzhenkov
Vadim Sashurin
Nadezhda Skardino
Alexandr Syman
Rustam Valiullin
Ekaterina Vinogradova
Olena Zubrilova

Bodybuilding
Vitaly Rudakovskiy

Boxing
Magomed Aripgadjiev
Viktar Zuyev

Canoeing

Aliaksei Abalmasau
Aliaksandr Bahdanovich
Andrei Bahdanovich
Leonid Geishtor
Volha Khudzenka
Artur Litvinchuk
Vadzim Makhneu
Iryna Pamialova
Nadzeya Papok
Vladimir Parfenovich
Maryna Pautaran
Raman Piatrushenka

Cross-country skiing
Sergei Dolidovich
Leanid Karneyenka
Svetlana Nageykina

Cycling
Natallia Tsylinskaya

Football

Yegor Alekseyenko
Illya Aliyew
Anton Bardok
Maria Belobrovina
Maksim Belov
Viktor Bezmen
Inna Botyanovskaya
Alyaksandr Buloychyk
Vital Deykala
Aleksey Dovgel
Alyaksey Dvaretski
Aleksandr Filanovich
Yuriy Goltsev
Alyaksandr Halowchyk
Leanid Harai
Alexander Hleb
Artsyom Huzik
Kirill Isachenko
Dmitry Kalineyko
Yevgeni Kalinin
Zarina Kapustina
Maksim Kazlovich
Ihar Khmelyuk
Yevgeniy Kostyukevich
Vyacheslav Krivulets
Aleksandr Krovetskiy
Sergey Kubarev
Stepan Kuntsevich
Jemal Kurshubadze
Anton Kustinskiy
Vladislav Kuzhal
Andrey Latypaw
Dzyanis Lebedzew
Pavel Lyutsko
Uladzimir Malyshaw
Maksim Moiseyev
Dzyanis Myadzvedzew
Vladislav Nikityanov
Anton Novikaw
Alyaksey Pohe
Aleksandr Puzevich
Aleksey Pyshinskiy
Dzmitry Rabtsaw
Maksim Savostikov
Artur Semenov
Syarhey Shastakow
Anton Shunto
Artem Shut
Alyaksandr Sobal
Yury Stadolnik
Aleksey Sychkov
Alyaksey Tarabanaw
Irina Tretyakova
Ilya Ushakov
Sergey Vabishchevich
Marat Voranaw
Ihar Zanyamonets

Freestyle skiing
Dmitri Dashinski
Aleksei Grishin
Anton Kushnir
Alla Tsuper

Gymnastics

Tatyana Ananko
Olesya Babushkina
Tatyana Belan
Svetlana Boginskaya
Liubov Charkashyna
Anna Glazkova
Maryna Hancharova
Irina Ilyenkova
Anastasia Ivankova
Olga Korbut
Maria Lazuk
Nataliya Leshchyk
Zinaida Lunina
Glafira Martinovich
Aliaksandra Narkevich
Olga Puzhevich
Yulia Raskina
Ksenia Sankovich
Vitaly Scherbo
Alina Tumilovich
Inna Zhukova

Ice hockey
Mikhail Grabovski
Vyacheslav Gretsky
Andrei Kostitsyn
Sergei Kostitsyn
Ruslan Salei
Yegor Sharangovich

Judo
Anatoly Laryukov
Ihar Makarau

Modern pentathlon
Pavel Dovgal

Rowing

Yuliya Bichyk
Tamara Davydenko
Natallia Helakh
Ekaterina Karsten
Yelena Mikulich
Aleksandra Pankina
Yaroslava Pavlovich
Valentina Skrabatun
Nataliya Volchek
Marina Znak

Shooting
Igor Basinsky
Sergei Martynov
Lalita Yauhleuskaya

Speed skating
Igor Zhelezovski

Swimming
Aleksandra Gerasimenya
Ilona Katliarenka

Table tennis
Veronika Pavlovich
Viktoria Pavlovich
Vladimir Samsonov

Tennis

Victoria Azarenka
Olga Govortsova
Max Mirnyi
Tatiana Poutchek
Aryna Sabalenka
Aliaksandra Sasnovich
Vladimir Voltchkov
Natasha Zvereva

Volleyball
Georgy Mondzolevski
Yuri Sapega

Weightlifting

Henadzi Aliashchuk
Andrei Aramnau
Hanna Batsiushka
Liubou Bialova
Iryna Kulesha
Sergey Lavrenov
Nastassia Novikava
Andrei Rybakou
Maryna Shkermankova
Tatsiana Stukalava

Wrestling

Dmitry Debelka
Murad Haidarau
Sergey Lishtvan
Viachaslau Makaranka
Aleksandr Medved
Aleksey Medvedev
Aleksandr Pavlov
Valery Shary
Mikhail Siamionau
Valery Tsilent

See also
Belarus at the Olympics
Sport in Belarus
List of Belarusians

References

Lists
Belarusian sportspeople